For the 2012–13 season, Al-Shoalah competed in the first tier of Saudi Arabian football, Saudi Professional League.

League table

Squad statistics

|}
Source:

Top scorers

Source:

Disciplinary record

Source:

Transfers

Summer Transfers

In

Out

Winter Transfers

In

Out

Results

Pro League

Crown Prince Cup

References

Al-Shoalah
Al-Shoulla FC